The Touraine District (District 11) is a municipal district in the city of Gatineau, Quebec. It is represented on Gatineau City Council by Tiffany-Lee Norris Parent of Action Gatineau.  The district was known as Riverains from 2002 to 2009.

The district is located in the Gatineau sector of the city. The district includes the neighbourhoods of Riviera, Touraine, Val d'Oise and Le Baron. Much of the district lies in the former municipality of Touraine.

Councillors
Thérèse Cyr (2002-2005)
Denis Tassé (2005-2017)
Nathalie Lemieux (2017–2021)
Tiffany-Lee Norris Parent (2021–present)

Election results

2001

2005

2009

2013

2017

2021

References

Districts of Gatineau